Play Dead is the first novel by American crime writer Harlan Coben.  This book was reissued by Signet in September, 2010.

Plot summary
No sooner had supermodel Laura Ayers and Celtics star David Baskin said "I do" than tragedy struck. While honeymooning on Australia's Great Barrier Reef, David went out for a swim—and never returned. Now widowed and grieving, Laura's search for the truth will draw her into a web of lies and deception.

1990 American novels
American mystery novels
Novels by Harlan Coben